is a Japanese football player. He currently plays for JEF United Chiba.  

He previously had a loan spell at fellow J2 League side Tokushima Vortis. His regular playing position is forward.

Club career

After graduating from Kwansei Gakuin University, Goya signed for J1 League side Gamba Osaka ahead of the 2016 season and was handed the number 23 jersey.   He made his J1 League debut as a second-half replacement for Shun Nagasawa in a 1-0 win away to Ventforet Kofu on 6 March 2016.   He scored once in 14 league games during his first campaign at senior level with the goal coming against Albirex Niigata on 29 October.   Goya also appeared once in both the Emperor's Cup and the AFC Champions League as well as scoring one goal in 4 substitute appearances in the J.League Cup.   Unfortunately for him, he missed the decisive penalty in the final of the competition against Urawa Red Diamonds.

Although he found goals hard to come by for Gamba's top team in 2016, he had no such issues when playing for Gamba Under-23 in J3 where he found the back of the net 7 times in just 11 appearances.   The following year Gamba's Under-23 side was run more as a youth team unlike the reserve team status it had held in 2016 and as such Goya only played twice and didn't manage to notch any goals in those limited appearances.

At senior level, 2017 was also a disappointment with his game time much less than in the previous season.   He played just 9 times in J1 League, scoring once, a 92nd minute equaliser in a 3-3 draw away to Urawa Red Diamonds. He also made one appearance in both the Emperor's Cup and the J.League Cup to take his senior total to just one goal in 11 appearances.

In search of more game time Goya was sent on loan to Tokushima Vortis for the 2018 season.   However injury restricted him to just 7 games in which time he netted once before returning to Gamba for 2019.

Career statistics
Last update: 22 March 2019.

Reserves performance

Last Update: 1 February 2019

References

External links

1994 births
Living people
Kwansei Gakuin University alumni
Association football people from Hyōgo Prefecture
Japanese footballers
J1 League players
J2 League players
J3 League players
Gamba Osaka players
Gamba Osaka U-23 players
Tokushima Vortis players
V-Varen Nagasaki players
Kashiwa Reysol players
Oita Trinita players
JEF United Chiba players
Association football forwards
Universiade bronze medalists for Japan
Universiade medalists in football